Steve Stewart is an American sportscaster, currently serving as a pregame host and play-by-play announcer on the Kansas City Royals Radio Network.  The 2011 season was his fourth with the Royals, his 12th in the Major Leagues and his 20th broadcasting baseball.  
Stewart spent four years as a Cincinnati Reds broadcaster (2004–2007), the first 3 on WLW Radio and in 2007 on TV as a pre-game host and fill-in play-by-play announcer for FSN Ohio.  From 2000-2003, he filled in on Baltimore Orioles broadcasts on WBAL, where he was a sports anchor on both WBAL Radio and TV.  In 2002, he called several St. Louis Cardinals games on KMOX.  He's broadcast basketball games for several colleges, including the Universities of Richmond, Maryland, Cincinnati (football and basketball) and Xavier.

Stewart is a St. Louis native and a graduate of Southern Methodist University.

References 

http://ireader.olivesoftware.com/Olive/iReader/KCSPress/SharedArticle.ashx?document=KCS\2014\01\22&article=Ar01703

External links 
Steve Stewart's blog
Bad Boy Blog

College football announcers
Year of birth missing (living people)
Living people
American radio sports announcers
American television sports announcers
Baltimore Orioles announcers
Cincinnati Reds announcers
College basketball announcers in the United States
Kansas City Royals announcers
Major League Baseball broadcasters
People from St. Louis
Southern Methodist University alumni